Kate Horne (born August 23, 1954 in Revelstoke, British Columbia, Canada) is a Canadian curler.

Teams and events

Women's

Mixed

Private life
Kate Horne married with Canadian curler and coach Darryl Horne, who coached Cathy Borst team to bronze at the 1998 World Women's Curling Championship and Alberta's Heather Nedohin team to bronze at the 2012 World Women's Curling Championship. She is the past winner of the B.C. Nisei bonspiel, for curlers of Japanese descent.

References

External links
 
 Kate Horne - Curling Canada Stats Archive
 The lceman cometh | Edmonton Sun

Living people
1954 births
People from Revelstoke, British Columbia
Curlers from Edmonton
Canadian women curlers
Curlers from British Columbia
Canadian women's curling champions
Canadian sportspeople of Japanese descent
Canada Cup (curling) participants